The 2011 Rally Sweden was the opening round of 2011 World Rally Championship season. It was the season's first and only event held on snow- and ice-covered gravel roads. The rally took place over 10–13 February, beginning with a Super Special Stage in the event's base town of Karlstad. The rally was also the first round of the Production World Rally Championship.

Citroën will use their DS3 model, and Ford will use the Fiesta RS over the course of the 2011 season. Also introduced for the 2011 season is the Power Stage, in which the final stage of each rally will award bonus points towards the championship standings. The fastest driver on the stage, will receive three points with two for the second-fastest and one for the third-fastest.

Mikko Hirvonen took the 13th WRC win of his career, and his first victory since winning the same event in 2010, having overhauled Mads Østberg midway through the second day. Østberg took his best result in the championship, finishing on the podium for the first time just 6.5 seconds behind Hirvonen. The podium was completed by another Ford driver, as Hirvonen's teammate Jari-Matti Latvala finished third, 34 seconds behind Hirvonen. Sébastien Ogier finished as the best Citroën driver in fourth place, and also picked up maximum bonus points with his victory on the first Power Stage of the season. Fellow Citroën driver Petter Solberg rounded out the top five places, despite losing his licence before the final stage due to a speeding infringement on Friday afternoon. With the ban coming into effect prior to the final stage, Solberg's co-driver Chris Patterson had to drive the stage.

In the supporting PWRC class, Martin Semerád took his first victory by over five minutes ahead of Yuriy Protasov.

Results

Event standings

Special stages

Power Stage
The first ever "Power stage", a live televised 4.16 km short stage at the end of the rally, was held near the village of Gustavsfors.

Standings after the rally

Drivers' Championship standings

Manufacturers' Championship standings

References

External links
 Results at eWRC.com

Sweden
Swedish Rally
Rally